The Hersfeld-Preis is an award for an actor. It has been awarded annually since 1962 as part of the Bad Hersfelder Festspiele of the Gesellschaft der Freunde der Stiftsruine and the city of Bad Hersfeld. Actors will be awarded of the current festival season, which will be selected by a five-member jury of critics.

Winners 
The Großer Hersfeld-Preis has been awarded since 1962, the Hersfeld-Preis since 1969.

References

External links 

 Chroniken der Bad Hersfelder Festspiele
Termine 2008

German theatre awards
German awards
Awards established in 1962
1962 establishments in West Germany